Preston Spradlin is an American college basketball coach and current head coach for the Morehead State Eagles men's basketball team.

Coaching career
After a playing career at NAIA Alice Lloyd College, Spradlin joined John Calipari's staff at Kentucky as a graduate assistant from 2009 to 2011, and assistant director of basketball operations from 2011 to 2014. He also aided Calipari with the Dominican Republic national basketball team in 2011 and 2012.

Spradlin joined Sean Woods's staff at Morehead State in 2014 as an assistant coach, and was elevated to interim head coach when Woods resigned amid player allegations that he had assaulted them. After going 12-9 in the interim role, and guiding the Eagles to a 10-6 conference record in Ohio Valley Conference play in the East Division, Spradlin was given the job on a permanent basis.

Head coaching record

NCAA DI

‡ Woods resigned 12/15/16; Spradlin coached rest of season.

References

Living people
American men's basketball coaches
Basketball coaches from Kentucky
Morehead State Eagles men's basketball coaches
Kentucky Wildcats men's basketball coaches
People from Pikeville, Kentucky
Year of birth missing (living people)
Alice Lloyd College people